Bravery Repetition and Noise is the eighth full-length album by American psychedelic rock band The Brian Jonestown Massacre, released in 2001.

Writing and production 

All the songs were written by Anton Newcombe, except the track "Sailor," originally by The Cryan' Shames. The album was produced by Anton Newcombe and Rob Campanella with additional mixing by Courtney Taylor.

Content 

The front cover features American independent film director Jim Jarmusch. Incidentally, The Brian Jonestown Massacre's song "Not if You Were the Last Dandy on Earth" appears on the soundtrack to his film Broken Flowers.

Track listing

All songs written by Anton Newcombe, except the track "Sailor," originally by The Cryan' Shames.

"Just for Today" – 4:18
"Telegram" – 2:33
"Stolen" – 1:30
"Open Heart Surgery" – 4:19
"Nevertheless" – 3:32
"Sailor" – 3:43
"You Have Been Disconnected" – 3:24
"Leave Nothing for Sancho" – 2:56
"Let Me Stand Next to Your Flower" – 4:55
"If I Love You?" – 2:31
"(I Love You) Always" – 3:29
"If I Love You? (New European Gold Standard Secret Babylonian Brotherhood Cinema Mix)" – 6:19

Personnel
The Brian Jonestown Massacre
Anton Newcombe – vocals, guitar, bass, mini moog, mellotron, organ, drums, horns
Jeffrey Davies – guitar, organ, fuzz, vocals
Rob Campanella – Hammond organ, Mellotron, acoustic guitar, classical guitar, 12-string electric guitar, vox fuzz repeater
Frankie Emerson – guitar
Hunter Crowley – drums
David Koenig – bass
Bobby Hecksher – guitar
James Ambrose – vocals, guitar
Raymond Richards – pedal steel guitar
Jeff Levitz (credited as Jeff Levitts) – guitar
Mara Keagle – vocals
Raugust – flute

 Technical personnel

Courtney Taylor-Taylor - additional mixing
Mark Chelek - mastering

References 

2001 albums
The Brian Jonestown Massacre albums